Adam and Eve is a 1923 German silent drama film directed by Friedrich Porges and Reinhold Schünzel and starring Werner Krauss, Dagny Servaes and Rudolf Forster.

Cast
 Werner Krauss
 Dagny Servaes
 Rudolf Forster
 Ruth Weyher
 Hermann Picha
 Loni Pyrmont

References

Bibliography

External links 
 

1923 films
Films of the Weimar Republic
German drama films
German silent feature films
1923 drama films
Films directed by Reinhold Schünzel
German black-and-white films
Films directed by Friedrich Porges
Silent drama films
1920s German films
1920s German-language films